Gavin Muir may refer to:

 Gavin Muir (British actor) (1951–2002), British actor and musician
 Gavin Muir (American actor) (1900–1972), American Broadway, film and television actor